The flags of Frisia are the flags that are used to represent (the subdivisions of) Frisia, a cross-border cultural region in Northwestern Europe. Some designs are in official use on a local or provincial level, while others are used unofficially on a regional, linguistic or international level.

Interfrisian flag 
As of today, two designs for an "Interfrisian flag" have been proposed. The first design was created in 2006 by the Groep fan Auwerk and is based on the flags of Norway and Iceland. In 2009, an alternative design was adopted by the Interfrisian Council, featuring elements of the flags of its three sections: North, East and West Frisia.

Subdivisions

West Frisia

East Frisia

North Frisia

Gallery

See also 
 Flag of Friesland
 Frisian eagle
 Seeblatt

References 

Frisia
Frisia
Frisia
Flags of indigenous peoples